Bad Behaviour is a 1993 British comedy film directed by Les Blair and starring Stephen Rea, Sinéad Cusack and Philip Jackson. The film depicts an Irish couple living with their family in North London.

Cast
 Stephen Rea - Gerry McAllister
 Sinéad Cusack - Ellie McAllister
 Philip Jackson - Howard Spink
 Clare Higgins - Jessica Kennedy
 Phil Daniels - The Nunn Brothers
 Mary Jo Randle - Winifred Turner
 Saira Todd - Sophie Bevan
 Amanda Boxer - Linda Marks
 Luke Blair - Joe McAllister
 Joe Coles - Michael McAllister
 Tamlin Howard - Jake Spink
 Emily Hill - Rosie Kennedy
 Philippe Lewinson - Jason
 Ian Flintoff - Chairperson
 Kenneth Hadley - Priest

Year-end lists 
 Top 12 worst (Alphabetically ordered, not ranked) – David Elliott, The San Diego Union-Tribune

References

External links
 

1993 films
1990s English-language films
1993 comedy films
British comedy films
1990s British films